Edward Grimes may refer to:

Edward Grimes (politician) (c.1811–1859),  Auditor-General and member of the Victorian Legislative Council
Edward Grimes (singer) (born 1991), one of the Irish singing twins known professionally as Jedward